Antje Bornhak is a German mountain bike orienteer. At the 2002 World MTB Orienteering Championships in Fontainebleau she won a bronze medal in the long distance, and a bronze medal in the sprint. At the 2004 World MTB Orienteering Championships in Ballarat she won a bronze medal in the long course. At the 2005 World Championships in Banska Bystrica she won a gold medal in the relay, together with Anke Dannowski and Gerit Pfuhl, and a silver medal in the long distance.

References

German orienteers
Female orienteers
German female cyclists
Mountain bike orienteers
Living people
Place of birth missing (living people)
Year of birth missing (living people)